My Name Is Red is a 1998 Turkish novel by writer Orhan Pamuk translated into English by Erdağ Göknar in 2001.  The novel, concerning miniaturists in the Ottoman Empire of 1591, established Pamuk's international reputation and contributed to his reception of the Nobel Prize in Literature in 2006.

The book has been translated into more than 60 languages since publication. The French translation won the French Prix du Meilleur Livre Étranger and the Italian version the Premio Grinzane Cavour in 2002. The English translation, My Name Is Red, won the International Dublin Literary Award in 2003.

In recognition of its status in Pamuk's oeuvre, the novel was re-published in Erdağ Göknar's translation as part of the Everyman's Library Contemporary Classics series in 2010. BBC Radio 4 broadcast an adaptation of the novel in 2008.

Outline
Several of the major characters in the novel belong to the same workshop of miniaturists  in the Ottoman Empire during the reign of Murat III. The first chapter of the novel ("I am a corpse") is narrated by one of the workshop's illuminators (Elegant Effendi) who has just been murdered. In the chapters narrated by his murderer, the reader learns that this illuminator was concerned about the increasingly Western attitude towards painting in a project commissioned by the Sultan. 

Subsequent chapters are narrated by different characters - - including four living members of the Sultan's workshop, a man named Black who has just returned to his uncle's home in Istanbul after 12 years of travel and who is the first living character to narrate the novel - -, by several drawings (the archetype of a horse, a dog, a counterfeit gold coin, Satan, and two dervishes); and one chapter, which gives the novel its name, is narrated by the color red.  In all, there are 21 different narrators.

Enishte Effendi, the maternal uncle of the main character (Black), is reading the  Book of the Soul by Ibn Qayyim Al-Jawziyya, a Sunni commentator on the Qur'an, and continuous references to it are made throughout the book. Al-Jawziyya argues, in the same fashion as Islamic doctrine, that the souls of the dead remain on earth and can hear the living. 

For some of the miniaturists, in particular the head of the Sultan's workshop Master Osman, viewing miniatures or "perfected art" is less a way of seeing than a way of knowing the eternal.  The many stories of master painters going blind at the end of their careers is thus presented less as an infirmity than as a consecration.

Like the drawings that narrate their stories, Shekure -- Black's widowed cousin and romantic interest -- is a narrator aware she is being read—"...just like those beautiful women with one eye on the life within the book and one eye on the life outside, I, too, long to speak with you who are observing me from who knows which distant time and place." The murderer, too, often reminds the reader he is self-conscious that what he says is being scrutinized for clues as to his identity.

Characters
 Elegant Effendi, murdered miniaturist who speaks from the afterlife to the reader in the opening chapter.
 Kara (Black), miniaturist and binder. Recently returned from 12 years away in Persia.  Nephew of Enishte ("Uncle").
 Enishte Effendi, maternal uncle of Black, who is in charge of the creation of a secret book for the Sultan in the style of the Venetian painters.
 Shekure, Enishte's beautiful daughter with whom Black is in love; Shekure (related to English 'sugar' refers to Shirin, meaning 'sweet', also the name of Pamuk's mother).
 Shevket, Shekure's older son (also the name of Orhan Pamuk's older brother).
 Orhan, Shekure's younger son (also Pamuk's first name).
 Hasan, the younger brother of Shekure's husband.
 Hayriye, slave girl in Enishte's household, Enishte's concubine.
 Master Osman, head of the Sultan's workshop of miniaturists. This character is based on Nakkaş Osman.
 Butterfly, one of three miniaturists suspected for the murders.
 Stork, one of three suspect miniaturists.
 Olive, one of three suspect miniaturists. This character is based on Veli Can
 Esther, a Jewish  peddler, a matchmaker, carries lovers' letters.
 Nusret Hoja, a Conservative Muslim leader who may be based on an historical figure. Opposes coffee and coffeehouses, bawdy stories, and figurative paintings.

Books within the book
A number of books illustrated by famous miniaturists are referenced by the characters in My Name is Red:  Several of the specific manuscripts described (most prominently the Shahnama of Shah Tahmasp, more commonly known in the west as the Houghton shahnama) are real and survive in whole or part.
 Book of the Soul by Ibn Qayyim al-Jawziyya
 Surname-i Hümayun – Book of Imperial Festivities, by Nakkaş Osman (miniatures) and Seyyid Lokman Çelebi, in the story still under completion
 Shahnameh or the Book of Kings by the Persian poet Firdawsi, is the national epic of the Persian-speaking world.
 Chronicle of Sultan Selim
 The Convergence of the Stars, ordered by Sam Mirza Safavi, son of Shah Ismail
 Hüsrev and Shirin by Persian Nizami (English: Khosru and Shireen), this love story forms the central idea behind the love story in My Name is Red
 Book of Equines by the Bukharan scholar Fadlan (a drawing of a horse is the key to finding the murderer in My Name is Red)
 The Illustration of Horses, three volumes on how to draw horses: The Depiction of Horses, The Flow of Horses, and The Love of Horses by Jemalettin of Kazvin
 The Blindman's Horses, a critique on the prior three volumes, by Kemalettin Riza of Herat
 History of Tall Hasan, Khan of the Whitesheep by Jemalettin
 Gulestan by Sadi
 Book of Victories with the funeral ceremonies of Sultan Süleyman the Magnificent
 Book of Skills

Reception
My Name Is Red received favourable reviews when published in English. A reviewer for Publishers Weekly admires the novel's "...jeweled prose and alluring digressions, nesting stories within stories" and concludes that Pamuk will gain many new readers with this "...accessible, charming and intellectually satisfying, narrative." A Kirkus Reviews critic describes the novel as "...a whimsical but provocative exploration of the nature of art in an Islamic society. . . . A rich feast of ideas, images, and lore." Jonathan Levi, writing in the L.A. Times Book Review, comments that "...it is Pamuk’s rendering of the intense life of artists negotiating the devilishly sharp edge of Islam 1,000 years after its birth that elevates My Name Is Red to the rank of modern classic." Levi also notes that the novel, although set four hundred years ago, reflects modern societal tensions. For this reason he calls it "...a novel of our time.’’

In The New York Times, Richard Eder describes Pamuk's intense interest in East-West interactions and explains some of the metaphysical ideas that permeate the novel. He also comments that the novel is not just about ideas: "Eastern or Western, good or bad, ideas precipitate once they sink to human level, unleashing passions and violence. ‘Red’ is chockfull of sublimity and sin." Eder also praises the characterization of Shekure, which he regards as the finest in the book. She is "...elusive, changeable, enigmatic and immensely beguiling." Eder concludes: "They (readers) will . . . be lofted by the paradoxical lightness and gaiety of the writing, by the wonderfully winding talk perpetually about to turn a corner, and by the stubborn humanity in the characters’ maneuvers to survive. It is a humanity whose lies and silences emerge as endearing and oddly bracing individual truths".

English translation
Erdağ M. Göknar's translation of My Name Is Red gained Pamuk international recognition and contributed to his selection as Nobel laureate; upon publication, Pamuk was described as a serious Nobel contender. The translation received praise from many reviewers including John Updike in The New Yorker: "Erdağ M. Göknar deserves praise for the cool, smooth English in which he has rendered Pamuk's finespun sentences, passionate art appreciations, sly pedantic debates, (and) eerie urban scenes." Many readers and critics consider My Name Is Red to be Pamuk's best work in English translation.

It won the International Dublin Literary Award in Dublin in 2003, where Göknar accepted the award on behalf of Pamuk. As is customary with this award, Göknar received a quarter share of the prize.

A recent study examined the faithfulness of the novel's translations using quantitative methods.

Release details
1998, Turkey, Iletisim Yayincilik, Pub date ?  ? 1998, hardback (First Turkish edition)
2001, USA, Alfred A Knopf, Pub date ? August 2001, hardback (First English edition)
 2001, UK, Faber & Faber, Pub date 2 November 2001, paperback
 2002, UK, Faber & Faber, Pub date 31 July 2002, paperback
 2002, USA, Vintage Books, Pub date ? September 2002, paperback (Translated by Erdag Goknar)
 2008, UK, Dramatised on BBC Radio 4 in 2 parts by Ayeesha Menon, directed by John Dryden, August 2008

References

External links
 Orhan Pamuk discusses My Name is Red on the BBC World Book Club
 Murder in miniature: A sixteenth-century detective story explores the soul of Turkey: John Updike writes about My Name Is Red at The New Yorker
 Richard Eder's review at The New York Times
 Extensive excerpts at Book Excerptise
 Medieval Sourcebook – Khosru and Shireen
 Orhan Pamuk at Nobelprize.org

Fiction set in the 1590s
1998 novels
Alfred A. Knopf books
Historical novels
Nobel Prize in Literature
Novels by Orhan Pamuk
Novels set in the Ottoman Empire
Novels set in Istanbul
Metafictional novels
Postmodern novels